The 2016 season is Buriram United's 5th season in the Thai Premier League. The club enters the season as the Thai Premier League Champion, and will participate in the Thai League, FA Cup, League Cup, Kor Royal Cup, Toyota Premier Cup and the AFC Champions League.

This is Buriram United's name changing.
 1970–2009 as Provincial Electricity Authority Football Club (PEA)
 2010–2011 as Buriram Provincial Electricity Authority Football Club (Buriram PEA)
 2012–present as Buriram United Football Club (Buriram United)

Players

First team squad

Appearances and goals

Transfers
First Thai footballer's market is opening on December 27, 2015 to January 28, 2016

Second Thai footballer's market is opening on June 3, 2016 to June 30, 2016

Transfers in

Transfers out

Loans out

Foreign players

Kit
Supplier: Buriram United Football Club / Sponsor: Chang

Non-competitive

Pre-season Asian Tour

Friendly matches

Competitions

Overall

Overview
{| class="wikitable" style="text-align: center"
|-
!rowspan=2|Competition
!colspan=8|Record
|-
!
!
!
!
!
!
!
!
|-
| League

|-
| FA Cup

|-
| League Cup

|-
| Kor Royal Cup

|-
| Premier Cup

|-
| Champions League

|-
! Total

Toyota Premier Cup

Kor Royal Cup

Toyota Thai League

League table

Results summary

Results by matchday

Score overview

Note: Buriram United goals are listed first.

Matches

Chang FA Cup

Toyota League Cup

AFC Champions League

Buriram United qualified for the Group Stage of the 2016 AFC Champions League due to finishing champion in the 2015 Thai Premier League.

Group stage

Buriram United is staying on group F, with Sanfrecce Hiroshima, FC Seoul and Shandong Luneng Taishan.

Statistics

Goalscorers

Notes

References

External links
 Buriram United official website
 Toyota Thai League website

Bur
2016